Anchusa crispa is a species of plant in the family Boraginaceae. It is found in France and Italy. Its natural habitats are Mediterranean-type shrubby vegetation and sandy shores. It is threatened by habitat loss.

References

crispa
Critically endangered plants
Taxonomy articles created by Polbot